The Silver Condor Award for Best Best Supporting Actor , given by the Argentine Film Critics Association, awards the best supporting actor in Argentina each year:

 
Argentine Film Critics Association